USS Jacamar (AMCU-25), was a  of the United States Navy.

History
Laid down on 1 September 1944, by the New Jersey Shipbuilding Corporation of Barber, New Jersey, the ship was launched on 2 October 1944, commissioned as USS LCI(L)-870 on 9 October 1944, and decommissioned in 1954. She was commissioned in 1944 and decommissioned after 1954.

Conversion to minesweeper
Laid up in the Reserve Fleet, her designation changed to Landing Ship Infantry (Large) LSIL, on 28 February 1949, and the ship was authorized for conversion to Coastal Minesweeper (Underwater Locator), in FY 1952 at Puget Sound Naval Shipyard, Bremerton, Washington. Renamed USS Jacamar (AMCU-25) on 7 March 1952, conversion began on 3 August 1953, was completed on 1 February 1954, and the ship was recommissioned as USS Jacamar (AMCU-25) on 1 December 1954.

Fate
Jacamar was sold on 21 July 1960.

Additional characteristics
 Armor, 10-lb. STS plating to splinter shields, pilothouse, and conning station.
 Fuel Capacity, 110 tons, lube oil 240 gallons.

References

External links
 

AMCU-7-class minesweepers
Ships built in Perth Amboy, New Jersey
1944 ships
World War II amphibious warfare vessels of the United States
Cold War mine warfare vessels of the United States